Norias del Paso Hondo is a town in the state of Aguascalientes, Mexico. It is located 6 miles east-southeast of the city of Aguascalientes and has a population of 2,539.

External links

References

Populated places in Aguascalientes